Hadrodemus is a genus of mostly European capsid bugs in the tribe Mirini, discovered by Franz Xaver Fieber in 1858.  The type species Hadrodemus m-flavum is recorded from northern Europe including the British Isles.

Species 
According to BioLib the following are included:
 Hadrodemus m-flavum (Goeze, 1778)- type species (as Cimex m-flavum Goeze, 1778= Cimex marginellus Fabricius, 1781)
 Hadrodemus noualhieri (Reuter, 1896) (southern France, Iberian peninsula)

See also
 List of heteropteran bugs recorded in Britain

References

External links
 

Miridae genera
Hemiptera of Europe
Mirini